Pyxus International is an international storage, sales, distribution company and is a publicly held independent leaf tobacco merchant. The company generates revenue primarily by selling leaf tobacco and relevant processing fees charged from tobacco manufacturers worldwide. , the company’s enterprise value is $1.27 billion.  The company operates more than 50 manufacturing facilities worldwide. Its customer base include  tobacco manufacturers in United Kingdom, Japan, China, U.S., Southeast of Asia region and elsewhere. On February 8, 2018, the company announced investments in two Canadian cannabis growers and a United States-based hemp producer.

History 
Alliance One International was established in 2005, as a result of the corporate merger between DIMON Incorporated and Standard Commercial Corporation. The company changed its name to Pyxus International in 2018.

DIMON Incorporated was founded in 1995, and later in 1997 it acquired Intabex Holdings Worldwide, which was the world's fourth-largest leaf merchant at the time. The company’s acquisition of Intabex was considered as the biggest one of that kind in the leaf history.

Standard Commercial Corporation, established in 1910, operated tobacco leaf business in Mediterranean area. It was the third-largest leaf merchant of the world prior to the merger with DIMON.

On June 15, 2020, Pyxus International Inc. filed for chapter 11 bankruptcy. The company's debtors emerged from bankruptcy on August 24, 2020.

Operations 
In December 2013, the company announced the expiration of its offer to exchange up to $735 million of 9.875% Senior Secured Second Lien Notes due 2021.

References

External links 

Agriculture companies established in 2005
Companies listed on the New York Stock Exchange
American companies established in 2005